William Alfred Comstock (July 2, 1877 – June 16, 1949) was an American politician as the 33rd governor of Michigan.

Early life
Born in 1877 in Alpena, Michigan, he attended the University of Michigan, where he was admitted to the Zeta Psi fraternity, graduating in 1899.  Within the Zeta Psi Fraternity, "The Vision of Bill Comstock" is known as his desire to unite all the chapters through the publication of a newsletter known as "The Circle," which he first published in 1909. He established a successful career in real estate, banking and railroad construction.

Politics
In 1911, Comstock entered politics by serving as the Democratic county chairman. He served as alderman of Alpena from 1911 to 1912 and served as its mayor from 1913–14. He was a member of University of Michigan board of regents, 1914–16. He was member of Michigan Democratic State Central Committee in 1915 and served as its chairman from 1920–24. Then he served as a member of Democratic National Committee from Michigan, 1924–30. He served as a delegate to Democratic National Convention from Michigan 1924 which nominated John W. Davis for U.S. President, again in 1928 to nominate Al Smith, and lastly in 1932 to nominate Franklin D. Roosevelt, the only successful candidate of the three. Comstock was an unsuccessful candidate for Governor of Michigan in 1926 and 1928 against Fred W. Green, and unsuccessful as well in 1930 against Wilber Marion Brucker.

In 1932, Comstock defeated Brucker and served as a Democratic governor of Michigan from 1933 to 1935.  During his tenure, the state's first sales tax law was authorized, an old age pension system was initiated, but later failed; a trust commission was established; and an eight-day bank holiday was affirmed, which later led to President Roosevelt's announcement of a national holiday. He also pardoned Rudolph G. Tenerowicz the former mayor of Hamtramck, who had been imprisoned for bribery with twelve others in 1932. Tenerowicz was later elected to U.S. Congress.

Retirement and death
Comstock later served as a member of the Michigan Civil Service Commission from 1939 to 1940, and as a member of the Detroit City Council from 1942 to 1949.
He was a member of the  Freemasons, Elks, Eagles, and Zeta Psi. He died at the age of 71 in Detroit, Michigan and is interred at Evergreen Cemetery of Alpena, Michigan.

References

Sourcing

External links
National Governors Association
Political Graveyard

1877 births
1949 deaths
American Episcopalians
Burials in Michigan
Democratic Party governors of Michigan
People from Alpena, Michigan
University of Michigan alumni
Regents of the University of Michigan
20th-century American politicians